IF Fram is a football club located in Saltvik in Åland. They are unique in that they no longer participate in the Finnish football league system but now take part in the Swedish football league system.

Background
Idrottsföreningen Fram are based in the municipality of Saltvik in Åland and were formed in 1922. The club currently specialises in football, athletics, skiing, hockey and table tennis.

In recent years IF Fram has participated in the lower divisions of the Swedish football league system.  The club currently plays in Division 6 Uppland Norra which is the eighth tier of Swedish football. They play their home matches at the Rangsby Stadium in Saltvik.

IF Fram is affiliated to the Ålands Fotbollförbund.

Season to season

Footnotes

External links
 IF Fram – Official website

Football in Åland
Football clubs in Finland
Association football clubs established in 1922
1922 establishments in Finland